St. Peter's Church, Chapel and Cemetery Complex is a historic Episcopal Gothic Revival church at 2500 Westchester Avenue and Saint Peters Avenue in Westchester Square, Bronx, New York City.

It was built in 1853 to designs by the architect Leopold Eidlitz in the Village of Westchester, now the East Bronx. The church was damaged heavily by fire and reconstructed and changed by Cyrus L. W. Eidlitz in 1878.  It is a Gothic Revival style, cruciform plan, church constructed of rock faced schist.  It features a square corner tower with buttressed corners and an octagonal belfry.

It was designated a New York City Landmark in 1976. It was added to the National Register of Historic Places in 1983.

Burials in the graveyard predated the church and include members of the Dutch settlement Oostdorp, or East Towne, and called Westchester by the English settlers in New Netherlands.

In 2013, the Bronx Academy of Arts and Dance relocated from the American Bank Note Company Building to the chapel on the grounds of St. Peter's Church.

References

External links
 Official website
 

Churches completed in 1853
19th-century Episcopal church buildings
Episcopal church buildings in the Bronx
Properties of religious function on the National Register of Historic Places in the Bronx
Gothic Revival church buildings in New York City
Leopold Eidlitz church buildings
Westchester Square, Bronx
Cemeteries in the Bronx
Event venues on the National Register of Historic Places in New York City
New York City Designated Landmarks in the Bronx